Hyman Y. "Hy" Weiss (February 12, 1923 – March 20, 2007) was an American record producer of pop and rhythm and blues music in the 1950s and 1960s, and the founder of Old Town Records.

Biography
Born to a Jewish family in Cuca, Argeș County, Romania, he was an immigrant to the United States as a baby in 1924 and was brought up in the Bronx, New York. There, he established a friendship with Morris Levy, who would also become active in the music business. He served in the US Army Air Force in World War II, before working briefly as a bouncer and as a furrier. He started in the music industry as a record salesman, and set up Parody Records with his brother Sam in 1949.

His record label, Old Town Records, was established in August 1953 and was active until 1966. Weiss took sole control of the label in 1956. He was primarily a producer of doo wop groups, as well as blues music. Old Town had its first hit with the 1958 single "We Belong Together" by Robert & Johnny, and had further hits by Billy Bland, the Solitaires, the Capris, the Earls, and others.  The Old Town catalog was sold by Weiss to Atlantic Records in 1970. Subsequently, Weiss worked for Stax Records. He had a co-writer credit for the song "Foggy Notion" by the Velvet Underground, along with all the members of the band. Weiss revived Old Town as a vehicle for Arthur Prysock in 1973 and kept the label going until about 1978.

Weiss was described as "one of the most colorful characters of the New York independent record business" and as "brash, miserable and explosive by turns... [He] had a bulging contacts book and was both courted and feared in an industry notoriously not for the faint-hearted." He was associated with the practice of "payola", being credited as the inventor of the "$50 handshake", and once said: "Why waste time going out with someone you don't like, and sit down and feast with them when you can't stand them? Just give them the money and let them play the [fucking] record."

Personal life
In 1954, he married Rosalyn Weiss; she died in 1996. He was a resident of Rockleigh, New Jersey. He died in Englewood, New Jersey, on March 20, 2007, at the age of 84. He was survived by two daughters, Maureen Weiss Spergel and Pam Weiss Katz; and a son, Barry Weiss, the Chairman and CEO of Island Def Jam/Universal Motown Republic.

Notable artists

References

External links
Article by Marv Goldberg on Hy Weiss and Old Town Records

1923 births
2007 deaths
Romanian Jews
Romanian emigrants to the United States
People from Argeș County
20th-century American Jews
American entertainment industry businesspeople
American people of Romanian-Jewish descent
People from Rockleigh, New Jersey
20th-century American musicians
Record producers from New Jersey
Songwriters from New Jersey
United States Army Air Forces personnel of World War II
21st-century American Jews